Tristan Tafel (born February 26, 1990) is a Canadian freestyle skier specializing in ski cross.

References

Canadian male freestyle skiers
1990 births
Living people